The historic Christ Church Cathedral in Louisville, Kentucky was founded on May 31, 1822. The original church building was completed in 1824, a new Romanesque Revival facade was added in 1870. The structure was listed on the National Register of Historic Places in 1973.

Christ Church became the Cathedral of the Episcopal Diocese of Kentucky in May 1894.

The original Christ Church building, built in 1824, was "considered a marvel of architectural beauty for its time. Most of it stands as the oldest church building in Louisville. It is presently the principal part of the Nave of the enlarged Christ Church Cathedral."

See also
List of the Episcopal cathedrals of the United States
List of cathedrals in the United States

References

External links 
 Parish Web Site, Christ Church Episcopal Cathedral, Louisville, Kentucky, USA

Churches completed in 1824
Churches in Louisville, Kentucky
Episcopal cathedrals in Kentucky
19th-century buildings and structures in Louisville, Kentucky
Local landmarks in Louisville, Kentucky
National Register of Historic Places in Louisville, Kentucky
Federal architecture in Kentucky
Victorian architecture in Kentucky
19th-century Episcopal church buildings
1824 establishments in Kentucky
Romanesque Revival architecture in Kentucky